Sampoorna Premayanam is a 1983 Telugu-language comedy film, produced by Midde Rama Rao under the Sri Rajyalakshmi Art Pictures banner and directed by N. B. Chakravarthy. It stars Sobhan Babu and Jaya Prada , with music composed by Chakravarthy. The film was a commercial success.

Plot
Venu (Shoban Babu) works as bus conductor at Prema Bus Transport Company, owned by Jagapathi Rao (Satyanarayana), who loves his daughter Prema (Jaya Prada) a lot. Dayanandam (Nutan Prasad) works as the manager at Jagapathi Rao's, always blackmails him for some reason and plans to fix his son Prasad's (Rajendra Prasad) marriage with Prema. Once Venu slaps Prasad for misbehaving with passengers, and for that, Dayanandam makes false allegations against Venu and terminates him from the service. Meanwhile, Venu's sister is suffering from a disease and he wants money for her treatment. Suddenly, a person Gopala Rao (Rao Gopal Rao) arrives, who is ready to give the amount required for his sister's treatment; as a return he asks him for a favor. He tells Venu to cheat Prema as if he loves her so that he can take revenge on Jagapathi Rao for cheating his sister in the past. In the beginning, Venu doesn't agree, but later he accepts the proposal because he senses Jagapathi Rao as his mother Parvatamma's (Annapurna) killer. After that, Gopal Rao takes love classes to Venu and makes him trap Prema into his love. One day, Gopal Rao visits Jagapathi Rao's house and reveals his entire plan, where a shocking discovery occurs; Prema is none other than Gopal Rao's sister's daughter. Gopal Rao rapidly moves to stop his plan; when he reaches Venu and Prema, he plays a drama that they sexually interact with each other. He requests Venu to marry Prema, but he refuses because of his desire for revenge against Jagapathi Rao. When Prema forces her father to tell the truth, he reveals that the real culprit was Dayanandam and he trapped him into it. At last, Venu, Gopala Rao and Jagapathi Rao unite and send Dayanandam behind bars. Finally, the movie ends on a happy note with the marriage of Venu & Prema.

Cast
Sobhan Babu as Venu
Jaya Prada as Prema
Rao Gopal Rao as Gopala Rao
Satyanarayana as Jagapathi Rao
Nutan Prasad as Dayanandam
Rajendra Prasad as Prasad
Suthi Veerabhadra Rao as Bhadram
Suthi Velu as Abba Rao 
Narra Venkateswara Rao as Joshi
Hema Sundar as Ramaiah
K. K. Sarma
Telephone Satyanarayana as Checking Inspector
Chidatala Appa Rao as Appa Rao 
Annapurna as Parvatamma
Silk Smitha as item number

Soundtrack

Music composed by Chakravarthy. Lyrics were written by Veturi.

References

Indian comedy films
Films scored by K. Chakravarthy
1984 comedy films
1984 films